Koiak 23 - Coptic Calendar - Koiak 25

The twenty-fourth day of the Coptic month of Koiak, the fourth month of the Coptic year. On a common year, this day corresponds to December 20, of the Julian Calendar, and January 2, of the Gregorian Calendar. This day falls in the Coptic season of Peret, the season of emergence. This day falls in the Nativity Fast.

Commemorations

Saints 

 The martyrdom of Saint Ignatius, the Theophorus, the Patriarch of Antioch 
 The departure of Saint Philogonus, the Patriarch of Antioch 
 The birth of Saint Takla Haymanout, the Ethiopian

References 

Days of the Coptic calendar